The 2009 Pittsburgh Panthers football team represented the University of Pittsburgh in the 2009 NCAA Division I FBS football season. The season was the fifth under head coach Dave Wannstedt. The 2009 season marked the team ninth at Heinz Field and the program's 120th season overall.  The 2009 season saw the introduction of a new offensive coordinator, Frank Cignetti, Jr. Pitt got off to a 9–1 start with impressive wins over Navy, Notre Dame for the second consecutive year, and Rutgers for the first time since 2004. Pitt was ranked number 9 in the AP and BCS polls and was off to its best start since 1982. However, Pitt lost the final two regular season games, including a last second loss by a field goal at West Virginia and a one-point loss at home for the Big East championship to undefeated Cincinnati, to finish the regular season at 9–3 (5–2 Big East) for the second consecutive year. The Panthers rebounded by winning the Meineke Car Care Bowl over North Carolina, 19–17, to achieve its first ten-win season since 1981. Pitt ranked number 15 in the final 2009 AP rankings with a 10–3 record. In addition, Pitt players garnered many post-season accolades in 2009, including Big East Offensive Player and Rookie of the Year in Dion Lewis, and Big East Co-Defensive Players of the Year in Mick Williams and Greg Romeus.

Previous season
The 2008 season saw the Panthers begin the year in the rankings, #25 in the AP Poll, their first preseason ranking since 2003. However, the Panthers lost their opening game at home to a lowly-regarded Bowling Green team that finished 2008 with a 6–6 record and without a bowl invitation and saw their coach fired the day after their last game. However, the Panthers seemed unfazed by their opening-game defeat and went on to win five straight games, including a home win against Iowa and a road win on a Thursday night at then-#10 South Florida, who later finished the regular season 7–5 and unranked. The win at South Florida vaulted the Panthers back into the polls, but their stay was short-lived when, two weeks later, they lost at home to a then-1–5 Rutgers team, whose win over the Panthers was the beginning of a run that saw the Scarlet Knights finish 8–5. Quarterback Bill Stull suffered a concussion in the Rutgers loss was forced to sit out the Panthers next game, a 36–33 road win over Notre Dame in which the Panthers, led by quarterback Pat Bostick and running back LeSean McCoy, came back from a 17–3 halftime deficit. The Panthers followed up their victory over Notre Dame with a 41–7 victory over Louisville. The Panthers lost their next game on the road to league-leading #19 Cincinnati, who indeed went on to win their first Big East championship in football. The Panthers closed out the regular season with two victories, a 19–15 win at home against West Virginia and a 34–10 road victory over Connecticut. Immediately following the Panthers' victory over the Huskies, bowl officials were on hand to invite the Panthers to the 2008 Sun Bowl, where the Panthers faced Oregon State in El Paso on December 31. Both teams struggled offensively in the game, and the Panthers were shut out for the first time in 12 years, falling to the Beavers 3–0.

Preseason
On February 5, 2009, the day after National Signing Day, it was made public that offensive coordinator Matt Cavanaugh would be leaving the Panthers to again pursue a career in the NFL. Cavanaugh's move to the Jets to become their new quarterbacks coach was not officially announced until February 9. The Panthers took only two weeks to find their new offensive coordinator, Frank Cignetti, Jr. Cignetti took a pay cut by accepting the offer from Pitt, but he cited the local cost of living and proximity to his own and his wife's families as major reasons for leaving California for Pitt. Cignetti has a reputation for developing quarterbacks and will be expected to do the same at Pitt where senior Bill Stull, Pitt's returning starter, and the passing game increasingly struggled down the stretch last season. The other primary candidates for the Panthers' offensive coordinator position were former Panthers head coach Walt Harris and New York Jets wide receivers coach Noel Mazzone.

Linebacker Adam Gunn was granted a sixth year of eligibility by the NCAA and will play in 2009, medical clearance pending. He was injured in the 3rd quarter of the 2008 season opener against Bowling Green when he collided with fellow linebacker Scott McKillop. Shane Murray, who was injured during the preseason in August 2008 and started at linebacker along with Gunn in 2007, will also be back with the Panthers in 2009. The returns of Gunn and Murray from injuries and Greg Williams, who started in place of Gunn in 2008, give the Panthers a stable of experienced linebackers headed into the 2009 season.

The NCAA released the 2009 Academic Progress Rate (APR) scores, which measure "a school's ability to retain its athletes and keep them eligible from semester to semester," on May 7. The 2009 scores are  data from the 2004–05 to 2007–08 academic years. The Panthers football team finished with the fifth best APR scores in the 8-team Big East, with a score of 944 out of a possible 1,000.

Recruiting
All players who signed with Pitt had verbally committed to the University within the year prior to signing a binding National Letter of Intent on national signing day. The Panthers also added one player who is not designated as a recruit, tight end Andrew Devlin, who transferred to Pitt in May and had been recruited by Coaches Wannstedt and Gattuso two years earlier in 2007 when had initially decided to play for the Virginia Cavaliers. He chose to transfer to Pitt after a change in offensive scheme would have forced him to change position to defensive with the Cavaliers.

Half of the Panthers new signees played high school football in Pennsylvania, and nine of those ten players were first-team all-state selections in 2008. The Panthers were expected to bring in players to add depth to the team – not necessarily an instant impact in 2009 – because the Panthers are no longer a struggling team in need of immediate performers. After signing day this class was not rated as a star-studded class that would be expected to provide an instant impact, but many of the players are viewed as players able to significantly contribute in the future. The players most expected to make an impact in the future are wide receiver Todd Thomas, tight end Brock DeCicco, running back Raymond Graham and linebackers Shane Gordon and Dan Mason. As of February 5, the 2009 recruiting class was ranked as the 47th best class nationally by Rivals.com – much lower than previous Wannstedt recruiting classes – and 28th best by Scout.com. Dave Wannstedt dismissed the criticism of his recruiting class as the low reviews of his class were a result of the low number of scholarships that the Panthers were able to offer due to the low number of graduating Pitt seniors in 2008 as well as a down year for high school seniors in western Pennsylvania.

Spring practices
Spring camp opened for the Panthers on March 19. Coach Wannstedt outlined his priorities heading into camp as determining the starters at running back and quarterback as well as the lineup at the various linebacker positions, most importantly in the middle.

The annual Blue-Gold game, the final scrimmage of spring camp, was played at Heinz Field on April 11. The University wanted to make it into a more appealing event for families and casual fans. As a result, they created various programs at the game, which was titled the "Pitt Spring Football Festival" in order to emphasize the various activities, which included a series of 20-minute "chalk talks" with coaches Wannstedt, Cignetti, and Bennett; an autograph session with former Panthers who went on to the NFL; and on-field drills with current players. Total attendance for the event was announced at 6,160.

As expected, the defense controlled most of the play throughout, defeating the offense 54–23, using a modified scoring system. The offense scored only one touchdown, a 54-yard, play-action pass from Bill Stull to Jon Baldwin. Bill Stull was the most effective of all the quarterbacks, going 12 of 17 for 132 yards with the touchdown and an interception. Freshman Dion Lewis, who enrolled early in January 2009, led the offense on the ground with thirty-four yards on twelve attempts. The defense, after allowing a touchdown and a field goal on the offense's first and second possessions, respectively, finished with three interceptions and six sacks the rest of the way and didn't allow the offense to score again. The defense held the offense to a net of sixteen rushing yards on thirty-seven carries. The game was broadcast live locally on WPCW in Pittsburgh and was replayed nationally on April 18 on the NFL Network.

The Ed Conway Award, which is given to the most improved players of the spring, was co-awarded to quarterback Pat Bostick and linebacker Max Gruder prior to the Blue-Gold Game.

Off-field issues
Seniors T.J. Porter, a wide receiver, and Tommie Duhart, a defensive lineman, officially left Pitt's football team at the end of the spring semester; both had been suspended from spring practices and did not participate. Duhart, along with senior cornerback Aaron Berry and sophomore offensive lineman Wayne Jones, was suspended on April 7 from the remainder of spring practices as well as the Blue-Gold game due to an unspecified "violation of team policy". Porter had been suspended from the team indefinitely after being cited for driving on a suspended driver's license and driving while intoxicated, his second DWI in under ten months. According to a statement issued by coach Wannstedt, both Porter and Duhart plan to transfer elsewhere.

A criminal complaint was filed against sophomore wide receiver and Aliquippa native Jon Baldwin on April 19, a day after the incident, in which Baldwin was charged with "indecent assault, harassment and disorderly conduct" following an incident with a female on a university-owned bus. Later in a non-jury trial in January, 2010, Baldwin was found not guilty on all charges.

Sixth year senior Adam Gunn, who only weeks earlier had been granted a sixth year of eligibility by the NCAA, was arrested in an incident that also involved former Panther Austin Ransom following an incident outside of a Pittsburgh night club. As a result of the charges against him – "misdemeanor charges of resisting arrest and failure to disperse, as well as summary offenses of disorderly conduct and public drunkenness" – Gunn was suspended from the team indefinitely pending the result of his hearing. All charges against Gunn were withdrawn at his preliminary hearing on June 16. According to Gunn's attorney, all charges were withdrawn due to the fact that "he employed no weapons, assaulted nobody and simply attempted to flee the scene".

Fall practice
The first official fall practice will open on Tuesday, August 11.

Award watchlists

Lombardi Award:
 Nate Byham, TE, Senior

Mackey Award:
 Nate Byham, Senior

Jim Thorpe Award:
 Aaron Berry, Senior

Roster

Rankings

The official preseason rankings are normally released in August of the same season, but various publications annually release early projections throughout the spring and summer. The Panthers have received mixed reviews from such publications. Phil Steele ranked the Panthers at #23. The Sporting News picked the Panthers to win the conference, but Athlon Sports, who left the Panthers out of their early rankings, project them to finish in fourth place. The Congrove Computer Rankings, a computer program that determines a team's ranking based upon projected regular season results, ranked the Panthers at #12 and predicted an 11–1 regular season record. The Panthers began the season unranked and just outside the Top 25 in both the AP Poll and Coaches Poll.

The Panthers found themselves in the "others receiving votes" category of the major polls throughout the first half of the season, and they officially moved into the Top 25 rankings in all four of the major polls following their October 16 victory at Rutgers. The Panthers climbed several move positions in each poll the following week as a result of their victory over South Florida.

Schedule
The official Big East schedule was released on March 6, and the Panthers' schedule includes five nationally televised games. The times of the two weeknight games on the schedule, at Louisville and at Rutgers, were announced with the initial release schedule. The Panthers' home intraconference games include Cincinnati, Connecticut, South Florida, and Syracuse; the away games include West Virginia, Louisville, and Rutgers. The Panthers nonconference games had been scheduled well in advance of the 2009 season, but the conference games took longer to schedule due to the difficulty some Big East teams had when trying to schedule their own nonconference opponents. The scheduled times for Pitt's first three games of the season were announced on July 7. A month later, on August 7, it was announced that the game against NC State was scheduled for 3:30 pm and to be broadcast nationally by ESPNU.

On October 26, the Syracuse game was announced as a noon kickoff for ESPNU, and on November 2, the Notre Dame game was announced as an 8:00 p.m. prime time telecast on ABC.

Television broadcast notes

Game summaries

Youngstown State

The 2009 season opener against Youngstown State was the Penguins' first trip to Pittsburgh since 2005, when they were defeated by the Panthers by a score of 41–0 in the first-ever meeting between the schools. In this, the second matchup between the schools, the Panthers again won handily, this time by a score of 38–3. The Panthers were led by true freshman running back Dion Lewis, who had fifteen carries for 132 yards in the first half. Their Panthers played both of their top two quarterbacks. Bill Stull, a fifth‑year senior and the returning starter, played for the entire first half and a portion of the third quarter and was booed by the home fans on several occasions, likely because of his on‑field struggles dating back to the previous season. Redshirt freshman Tino Sunseri played the remainder of the game. The Panthers outgained the Penguins  on the day.

Buffalo

The Panthers traveled to Buffalo to take on the Bulls, who were coming off a 23–17 Week 1 win at UTEP, in a game that was both the Panthers' first-ever trip to Buffalo and first road game of the season. The Panthers defeated the Bulls 54–27 and took advantage of four Bulls turnovers, which led to 27 Panther points, with linebacker Greg Williams returning one fumble 50 yards for a touchdown. The Panther offense gained 381 yards and committed no turnovers. Dion Lewis had his second straight 100-yard rushing game, gaining 236 total yards and scoring two touchdowns, including an 85-yard touchdown run, and Dorin Dickerson finished with eight catches for 71 yards and three touchdowns. The Panthers' 54 points was the highest offensive output during Dave Wannstedt's tenure at Pitt, which began in 2005; it was Pitt's highest output since scoring 55 points against Temple in 1999. However, the Bulls gained 500 yards of total offense on the day, and Buffalo quarterback Zach Maynard, who was making only his second career start, threw for 400 yards, a Buffalo record dating back to their re-ascension to Division I-A/FBS in 1999, and four touchdowns, which tied a Buffalo record during the same time, connecting with wide receiver Naaman Roosevelt on touchdowns of 67 and 54 yards. Pitt was penalized 11 times for 119 yards. Panthers starting free safety Andrew Taglianetti, who recovered a fumble in the first quarter, left the game with a torn ACL in his left knee and is taking a medical redshirt for the season.

Navy

The Panthers and Midshipmen face one another for the third consecutive season and have traded road victories over the previous two meetings, the Panthers winning 42–21 in Annapolis in 2008 and the Midshipmen winning 48–45 in overtime in Pittsburgh in 2007. The 2009 meeting was much lower scoring, the Panthers coming out on top 27–14. The win saw the Panthers improve their record to 3–0, the team's best start since 2000. The Midshipmen were expected to pass the ball with greater effectiveness under new quarterback Ricky Dobbs, but Navy was held to 89 passing yards. Navy led the nation in rushing yards per game during the previous four seasons as well as through the first three weeks of 2009, but were held to only 129 rushing yards against the Panthers, significantly lower than their 240-yard average coming into the game. The Pitt offense was much more effective than the Midshipmen, outgaining them 369–218.

Bill Stull, who saw limited action in the second half, finished the day 17-for-24 with 245 yards through the air, including 20 to himself when he caught his own tipped pass out of the air and scrambled downfield, almost scoring a touchdown; he almost scored a touchdown on the play but turned the ball over when he fumbled and Navy recovered at their own one yard line. Stull was 12-for-14 with 189 yards and one touchdown in the first half. Dion Lewis didn't quite have the same strong statistical performance, compiling 79 yards and one touchdown on the ground, but Navy linebacker Ross Pospisil complimented Lewis after the game, saying that he "thought Dion Lewis was almost as a good as McCoy", referring to LeSean McCoy's 156-yard, three-touchdown game against Navy in 2008. True freshman middle linebacker Dan Mason made his first start and made 11 tackles, including two sacks, which earned him Big East Defensive Player of the Week honors.

NC State

Pitt's trip to NC State was the Panthers' first trip to Raleigh since 1988 when the Panthers lost to the Wolfpack, 14–3, and the first overall matchup between the schools since the 2001 Tangerine Bowl, where the Panthers defeated the Wolfpack 34–19. Coming into the game, Pitt held a 5–2–1 advantage over NC State, dating back to the schools' first matchup in 1952.

The Panthers seized an early advantage in the game, jumping out to a 10–0 lead within the first six minutes of the game. The Panthers received the opening kickoff and were set up just across midfield after a Cameron Saddler return; the Panthers then scored the opening touchdown after only a four-play drive that was aided by a 15-yard personal foul penalty against NC State. The Wolfpack went three-and-out, and the Panthers second possession ended with a 35-yard field goal by Dan Hutchins. Going forward through the third quarter, both teams moved the ball on offense with relative ease and at which point the Panthers offense would fail to continue to produce. The teams ultimately combined for 830 total yards by the end of the game. NC State's Russell Wilson led the way, throwing for 322 yards and four touchdowns while also rushing for 91 yards. Wilson came into the game holding the NCAA record for pass attempts without an interception, and he increased his record by not throwing an interception against the Panthers.

The Panthers had built a 14-point lead near the end of the third quarter after Bill Stull connected with Jon Baldwin for a 79-yard pass, but the Panthers never scored again as NC State scored three consecutive touchdowns for the 38–31 win. The Wolfpack's come-from-behind scores came on drives of 45, 83, and 71 yards.

Louisville

Connecticut

Rutgers

South Florida

The October 24 game against South Florida was Pitt's homecoming, and the Panthers were seeking their first 7–1 start since 1982. The game was expected to be close and competitive, but the Panthers dominated throughout, winning 41–14. Pitt jumped out to a 31–7 lead by the end of the first half, in which Pitt scored on all five of its offensive possessions – four touchdowns and one field goal. Bill Stull, who finished 18 of 25 for 245 yards and two touchdown passes, wasn't sacked on the day and completed his first 11 passes of the game. Following the game, Stull gave the credit for the team's success on offense to his teammates, citing their ability to both block Bulls defenders as well as get open for passes.

Dion Lewis continued his strong freshman campaign by adding yards and two touchdowns, topping 1,000 for the season in the process.

Syracuse

Notre Dame

West Virginia

Cincinnati

The winner of the 2009 River City Rivalry, the Cincinnati Bearcats won the Big East Conference and earned the conference berth in the Bowl Championship Series, while Pitt's loss dropped the team to tie third in the conference with West Virginia after West Virginia defeated Rutgers that same day. After the loss, Pitt lead the all-time series against Cincinnati, 7–2, with the Bearcats winning the previous year.

North Carolina

Coaching staff

Team players drafted into the NFL

Postseason

Awards
Several Panthers earned accolades following the close of the regular season with ten players earning first- or second-team honors in the Big East Conference. Additionally, tight end Dorin Dickerson was one of three finalists for the Mackey Award, which was won by Aaron Hernandez of Florida. Offensive line coach Tony Wise was also named the Offensive Line Coach of the Year by FootballScoop.com.

All-Americans
Dickerson was also named as a first team 2009 College Football All-American by the Football Writers Association of America and CBS Sports. Dickerson was the third All-American from Pitt in four seasons and the first All-American tight end from Pitt since Mike Ditka in 1960. CBS Sports also named Dion Lewis as their Freshman of the Year and a second-team All-American. Dickerson and several other teammates were also named to various other All-America teams.

Big East Conference awards
The Big East Conference awards were awarded by vote among conference coaches and were announced on December 9. True freshman Dion Lewis won two major conference awards, Offensive Player of the Year and Rookie of the Year, the first player to win two Big East awards since Michael Vick of Virginia Tech in 1999. Additionally, voting for the conference's Defensive Player of the Year award finished in a tie between the Panther duo of Mick Williams and Greg Romeus, who shared the award.

The Panthers on the all-Big East first and second teams are:

References

General

Citation

Pittsburgh
Pittsburgh Panthers football seasons
Duke's Mayo Bowl champion seasons
Pittsburgh Panthers football